Cioteronel (developmental code name CPC-10997; former tentative brand names Cyoctol, X-Andron) is a nonsteroidal antiandrogen (NSAA) that was never marketed. It was under development between 1989 and 2001 for the topical treatment of androgenetic alopecia (male pattern baldness) and acne and for the oral treatment of benign prostatic hyperplasia; it reached phase III clinical trials for acne and phase II studies for androgenetic alopecia, but was ultimately discontinued due to poor efficacy.

See also 
 Delanterone
 Inocoterone
 Metogest
 Rosterolone
 Topilutamide
 Topterone
 Zanoterone

References 

Abandoned drugs
Anti-acne preparations
Ethers
Ketones
Nonsteroidal antiandrogens